Młynarski is a Polish surname meaning Miller (surname). Notable people with the surname include:

 Danuta Hübner née Młynarska (born 1948), Polish politician
 Emil Młynarski (1870–1935), Polish conductor
 Feliks Młynarski (1884–1972), Polish banker, philosopher and economist
 Młynarski dilemma
 Mieczysław Młynarski (born 1956), Polish basketball player
 Nela Młynarska, ballerina, Arthur Rubinstein wife
 Tomasz Młynarski (born 1977), Polish political scientist
 Wojciech Młynarski (1941–2017), Polish musician

See also 
 Andrew Mynarski
 Młynarska Wola

Polish-language surnames